Eucalyptus stenostoma, commonly known as the Jillaga ash, is a small to medium-sized tree in that is endemic to a restricted part of New South Wales. It has rough, fissured bark on the lower trunk, smooth creamy white bark above, lance-shaped adult leaves, flower buds in groups of thirteen to nineteen or more, white flowers and spherical fruit with a small opening.

Description
The bark on the lower trunk is rough, fissured, shortly fibrous and greyish black, the bark above smooth, white or yellow with insect scribbles and is shed in ribbons. Flowering occurs in summer and the flowers are white.

Taxonomy and naming
Eucalyptus stenostoma was first formally described in 1972 by Lawrie Johnson and Donald Blaxell in Contributions from the New South Wales Herbarium. The type specimens were collected in 1965 by David John Hynd (born 1937), near the head of the Tuross River north-west of Nerrigundah. The specific epithet (stenostoma)  is from ancient Greek words meaning "narrow" and "opening", referring to the opening of the fruit.

Distribution and habitat
Jillaga Ash grows only in the catchment areas of the Tuross and Deua Rivers, in steeply sloping dry woodland on relatively infertile soils. Difficult to locate, however, it is locally abundant in some sites.

References

External links
 Seed of Eucalyptus stenostoma. Australian Plant Image Index, Australian National Botanic Gardens, Australian National Herbarium.

stenostoma
Myrtales of Australia
Flora of New South Wales
Trees of Australia
Plants described in 1972